Dimethylnaphthalene may refer to:

 1,4-Dimethylnaphthalene (1,4-DMN)
 2,6-Dimethylnaphthalene (2,6-DMN)